Illawarra is a monotypic genus of Australian Australian funnel-web spiders containing the single species Illawarra wisharti. It was first described by Michael R. Gray in 2010, and has only been found in the Illawarra region of southern New South Wales. It is a member of the subfamily Atracinae, the Australian funnel-web spiders, a number of whose species produce venom that is dangerous to humans. The generic name is based on the Illawarra region where the spider was found. The species name wisharti honours Graeme Wishart, who collected many mygalomorph spiders in that region.

Description
Individuals are basically brown, with an obvious pattern of narrow chevrons on the abdomen. Females are of a similar size and overall appearance. They are said to have an "ant-like" smell.

Males differ from those of the other members of the subfamily Atracinae by the presence of a broad row of spines in the middle of the underside (ventral side) of the tarsi of all four legs. Females can be distinguished by the first leg, which lacks spines, has the metatarsus partly fused to the tarsus, and also has enlarged tarsal claws.

It lives in burrows in the ground litter layer or under rocks.

Venom

A study of the peptides in atracine spider venom in 2001 found that Illawarra wisharti venom had a similar profile to that of Atrax robustus, a species known to have caused dangerous envenomation effects in humans. However, I. wisharti is not one of the six atracine species listed as dangerous.

References

Atracidae
Spiders described in 2010
Spiders of Australia